Pará is a state of Brazil, located in northern Brazil and traversed by the lower Amazon River. It borders the Brazilian states of Amapá, Maranhão, Tocantins, Mato Grosso, Amazonas and Roraima. To the northwest are the borders of Guyana and Suriname, to the northeast of Pará is the Atlantic Ocean. The capital and largest city is Belém, which is located at the Marajó bay, near the estuary of the Amazon river. The state, which is home to 4.1% of the Brazilian population, is responsible for just 2.2% of the Brazilian GDP.

Pará is the most populous state of the North Region, with a population of over 8.6 million, being the ninth-most populous state in Brazil. Its most famous icons are the Amazon River and the Amazon Rainforest. Pará produces rubber (extracted from rubber tree groves), cassava, açaí, pineapple, cocoa, black pepper, coconut, banana, tropical hardwoods such as mahogany, and minerals such as iron ore and bauxite. A new commodity crop is soy, cultivated in the region of Santarém.

Every October, Belém receives tens of thousands of tourists for the year's most important religious celebration: the procession of the Círio de Nazaré. Another important attraction of the capital is the Marajó-style ceramics, based on the vanished Marajoara culture, which developed on an island in the Amazon River.

Etymology
The state's name is a toponym of the Tupi word pará – literally "sea", but sometimes used to refer to large rivers. The state was named after the river of the same name, the Pará River, one of the tributaries of the Amazon River.

History 
In 1500, the Spanish navigator Vicente Yáñez Pinzón was the first European to navigate the mouth of the Amazon River. On 26 August 1542, the Spaniard Francisco de Orellana reached the mouth of the Amazon River waterway, by river from Quito, Ecuador. On 28 October 1637, the Portuguese Pedro Teixeira left Belém and went to Quito: during the expedition, he placed a landmark in the confluence of the Napo and Aguarico, in the current border between Ecuador and Peru, to Portugal, and later to Brazil, getting the possession of most of the Amazon, including all of the current territory of Pará.

Prior to European Arrival

Archaeologists divide the ancient inhabitants of prehistory Brazil into groups according to their way of life and tools: hunter-gatherers of the coast and farmers. These groups were subsequently named by European settlers as "Indians". There are archaeological records proving the human presence in Brazil and the region of Santarém since 3000 BC.

Marajó people lived in farmers' huts or houses 3,500 years ago. These people knew ceramics, dyes, natural medicinal compounds; practiced slash-and-burn (to clear the land); and planted cassava. Their culture remains in Marajoara pottery, which has peculiar size and decoration. The period from 500 to 1300 was the height of the Marajoara culture.

Formation of Grão-Pará and Maranhão

The region of the Amazon valley, by the Treaty of Tordesillas (1494), was in possession of the Spanish Crown, the Portuguese expeditionaries, with the purpose of consolidating the region as Portuguese territory, founded the Fort of the Nativity (Forte do Presépio) in 1616, in Santa Maria de Belém do Grão-Pará (Saint Mary of Bethlehem of the Great Pará). The building was the first of the model on Amazon and the most significant in the Amazon territory until 1660. Despite the construction of fort, the occupation of territory was marked by early Dutch and English incursions in search of spices, hence the need of the Portuguese to fortify the area.

In the 17th century, the region, integrated into the captaincy of Maranhão, was prosperous with crops and livestock. In 1616 the captaincy of Grão-Pará was created, belonging to the Portuguese colonial state of Maranhão. In the same year the state of Grão-Pará and Maranhão transferred capital to Belém, forming and attaching the captaincy of Rio Negro in 1755 by creating the State of Grão-Pará and Rio Negro.

In 1751, with the expansion to the west, the colonial state of Grão-Pará, which besides the captaincy of Grão Pará would host the captaincy of São José do Rio Negro (today the State of Amazonas).

In 1823, the Pará decided to join the independent Brazil, which had been separated during the colonial period, reporting directly to Lisbon. However, political infighting continued. The most important of them, the Cabanagem (1835), decreed the independence of the province of Pará. This was, along with the Ragamuffin War, the only to lift the regency period when the power was taken. Cabanagem was the only revolt led by the popular strata.

Cabanagem

Cabanagem, a popular and social revolt during the Empire of Brazil, in the Amazon region, was influenced by the French Revolution. It was mainly due to extreme poverty, hunger and disease that devastated the Amazon at the beginning of the period, in the former province of Grão-Pará, which included the current Amazonian states of Pará, Amazonas, Amapá, Roraima and Rondônia. The revolt spread from 1835 until January 1840, due to the process of independence of Brazil (1822), which did not occur immediately in the province due to political irrelevance to which the region was relegated by Prince Regent Pedro I. After independence, the strong Portuguese influence remained stable, giving political irrelevance in this province to the Brazilian central government.

Indians, blacks, and mestizos (mostly poor class members), all named cabanos (cabins), teamed against the Regent Government and rebelled, to increase the importance of the region in Brazil's central government addressing the issue of poverty as one of the reasons. All lived in mud huts (hence the name of the revolt). At the bottom of the rebellion, there was a mobilization of the Brazilian Empire against the reactionary forces of the province of Grão-Pará in expelling the insurgents who wanted to keep the region as a Portuguese colony or territory independent. Many of the local leaders, who resented the lack of political participation in decisions of the centralizer of the Brazil government, contributed to the climate of dissatisfaction against the provincial government.

Rubber cycle and mineral extraction
After the revolt, the local economy grew rapidly during the 19th century and early 20th century by exploitation of rubber, the latex, by extracting it. At this period the Amazon experienced two distinct economic cycles with the exploitation of the same raw material.

The intendant Antônio Lemos was the main character of the urban transformation that Belém experienced, which came to be known as Paris n’America (Paris in the America), as a reference to the influence of the urbanization that Paris had experienced at the time, which served as the inspiration for Antônio Lemos.

During this period, for example, the city center was heavily lined with mango trees transported from India and development inspired by the model of Paris. With the decline of the two cycles of rubber (1870–1920 and 1940–1945), came a distressing economic stagnation, which stopped in the 1960s and 1970s, with the development of agricultural activities in the south of the state. From the decade of 1960s, but mainly in the 1970s, growth was accelerating with the exploitation of minerals mainly in the southeastern region of the state, as with iron extraction in the Serra dos Carajás and the Serra Pelada gold.

Geography

Climate 

A tropical rainforest climate is a type of tropical climate in which there is no dry season — all months have mean precipitation values of at least . It is usually found at latitudes within five degrees of the equator — which are dominated by the Intertropical Convergence Zone. The equatorial climate is denoted Af in the Köppen climate classification.

Vegetation 
The Amazon represents over half of the planet's remaining rainforests and comprises the largest and most species-rich tracts of tropical rainforest in the world. Wet tropical forests are the most species-rich biome, and tropical forests in the Americas are consistently more species rich than the wet forests in Africa and Asia. As the largest tract of tropical rainforest in the Americas, the Amazonian rainforests have unparalleled biodiversity. More than one-third of all species in the world live in the Amazon rainforest The largest biodiversity of the planet is present across the state of Pará.Large tracts of Pará state suffer from illegal deforestation and land occupation, mostly due to cattle ranching and soya farming. There have been conflicts between government, indigenous tribes, the Caboclos who are mixed-race peasants of the area, and ranchers over land rights. The situation is unlikely to be resolved soon, particularly due to the demand for beef from Europe and soya from China.

The controversial Belo Monte Dam is a proposed hydroelectric dam complex to be built on the Xingu River; opponents believe that it threatens the habitat of a relatively undisturbed area of Pará's rainforest, and would endanger several endemic fish species. It also is likely to attract further development and migration to the state, to the detriment of the state's rainforest.

Political subdivisions 

The largest cities by population (2016) are:
Belém 1,446,042
Ananindeua 510,834
Santarém, Pará 294,447
Marabá, Pará 272,172
Parauapebas 196,259
Castanhal 192,571
Abaetetuba 151,934
Cameta 132,515
Marituba 125,435
Braganca 122,881
Tucurui 122,580
Barcarena 121,074
Altamira, Pará 111,938
Paragominas 108,547
Itaituba 98,485

Demographics 
According to the IBGE of 2007, there were 7,136,000 people residing in the state. Urbanization: 75.2% (2006); Population growth: 2.5% (1991–2000); Houses: 1,754,000 (2006).

The last PNAD (National Research for Sample of Domiciles) census revealed the following numbers: 4,988,000 Brown (Multiracial) people (69.9%), 1,641,000 White people (23.0%), 470,000 Black people (6.6%), 35,000 Asian or Amerindian people (0.5%).

Ethnic groups 

The majority of the population is mixed, due to the large indigenous population and, to a lesser amount, those with African ancestry. In the last IBGE census (2010), 817,000 Brazilians classified themselves as indigenous, about 0.26% percent of the country's population.

Pará has attracted numerous Portuguese, Spanish, and Japanese immigrants. They have told their stories in a permanent space, the "Room Vicente Salles" of the "Memorial of the People", in Belém. The Portuguese colonists were followed by Spaniards fleeing wars and social unrest due to political disputes in the Iberian Peninsula. The Japanese have become established in agrarian communities, settling in towns such as Tomé-Açu.

Portuguese explorers and missionaries settled in the state in the 17th century. In January 1616, the Portuguese captain, Francisco Caldeira Castelo Branco began the occupation of the land, founding the Fort of the Nativity, nucleus of the future state capital. Portuguese religious missions were used to establish settlements between here and the Fort St. Louis of Maranhão. Most settlers sailed up the Amazon River as travel overland was extremely arduous. The Portuguese were the first to arrive in Pará, leaving contributions ranging from cuisine to architecture.

The first Japanese immigrants who settled in the Amazon left the Port of Kobe in Japan, on July 24, 1926, and reached the city of Tomé-Açu, on 22 September of that year, with stops in Rio de Janeiro and Belém.

The Japanese introduced crops such as jute and black pepper in the 1930s; jute was so successful that it drove a boom in the regional economy. In the 1970s, Japanese farmers introduced cultivation of Hawaiian papaya and melon, for which there is international demand. The third largest ethnic Japanese community in Brazil is in Pará, with about 13,000 inhabitants (surpassed only by settlements in the states of São Paulo and Paraná). They live mainly in the cities of Tomé-Açu, Santa Izabel do Pará, and Castanhal.

Italian immigrants in Pará came predominantly from the south of Italy, originating in Calabria, Campania and Basilicata. It was a time of a wave of emigration. They were all settlers and devoted to trade. The first Italian trade was recorded in 1888 in Santarém. The immigrants planted family roots in Belém, Breves, Abaetetuba, Óbidos, Oriximiná, Santarém and Alenquer. The presence in western Pará was so pronounced that the Consulate of Italy established an office in Óbidos, which is the largest city populated by Italians in the state. The consulate was in Recife, Pernambuco.

In Belém, the Italians worked in commercial and retail services. They were important during the beginning of the industrialization of the state capital (1895). According to the 1920 census, about 1,000 Italians lived in Pará. At the end of World War II, another wave of Italian immigrants arrived after the persecution of Japanese, Italians, and Germans. Similar to French immigrants, this wave of Italians did not remain in Pará.

Lebanese immigrants arrived in Pará in the mid-19th century, at the time of the rubber boom, and through 1914. There were between 15,000 and 25,000 Syrian-Lebanese immigrants, of whom one-third went to Acre. In Pará, the Lebanese settled in Belem, and in the cities of Cametá, Marabá, Altamira, Breves, Monte Alegre, Alenquer, Santarém, Óbidos, Soure, Maracanã, Abaetetuba, among others.

The first French immigrants arrived in Brazil in the second half of the 19th century, settling in the colony of Benevides, the metropolitan region of Belém do Pará. The French were attracted to the region because of the rubber boom, eventually settling in Belém, which became known as Paris N'América.

Largest cities

Education 

Portuguese is the official national language, and thus the primary language taught in schools. English and Spanish are part of the official high school curriculum.

Educational institutions 
 Universidade Federal do Pará (UFPA) (Federal University of Pará);
 Universidade Federal do Oeste do Pará (UFOPA) (Federal University of Western Pará);
 Universidade Federal do Sul e Sudeste do Pará (UNIFESSPA) (Federal University of Southern and Southeastern Pará)
 Universidade Federal Rural da Amazonia (UFRA) (Federal Rural University of Amazonia);
 Universidade do Estado do Pará (UEPA) (Pará State University);
 Universidade da Amazônia (UNAMA) (University of Amazon);
 Instituto Federal do Pará (IFPA) (Federal Institute of Pará);
 Centro Universitário do Pará (CESUPA) (University Center of Pará);

Economy 

The service sector is the largest component of GDP at 40.9%, followed by the industrial sector at 36.3%. Agriculture represents 22.8% of GDP (2004). Pará exports iron ore 31.1%, aluminium 22.2%, wood 13.5%, ores of aluminium 8.3%, others ores 7.9% (2002), representing 1.8% of the Brazilian economy (2005).

The mining sector represents 14% of the gross domestic product (GDP) of the state, originated mainly from the extraction of iron, bauxite, manganese, limestone and tin, as well as gold, until recently extracted from one of the largest mines of recent history: Serra Pelada. The economy of Pará is based also on the extraction of vegetation, on agriculture and cattle raising. Thanks to the rich soil and the important hydrographic basin – boats are the main means of transport in the region. Guaraná, a tree from which a powder is produced and used as a stimulant, and annatto seeds, a fruit used for cooking, as a sunscreen and for dye extraction. Its territory has one of the largest mining areas in the country, in the Carajás Mountains, a mining province where the Ferro Carajás Project is based, from Companhia Vale do Rio Doce. The complex produced 296 million metric tons of iron ore in 2007, exporting the product to many countries, among them Japan, Germany, Italy, France and Spain.

Pará is the largest producer of cassava, açaí, pineapple and cocoa of Brazil and is among the largest in Brazil in the production of black pepper (2nd place), coconut (3rd place) and banana (6th place).

In cassava production, Brazil produced a total of 17.6 million tons in 2018. Pará was the largest producer in the country, with 3.8 million tons.

In 2019, Pará produced 95% of açaí in Brazil. The state traded more than 1.2 million tons of the fruit, worth more than US$1.5 billion, about 3% of the state's GDP.

In 2018, Pará was the largest Brazilian producer of pineapple, with 426 million fruits harvested on almost 19 thousand hectares. In 2017, Brazil was the 3rd largest producer in the world (close to 1.5 billion fruits harvested on approximately 60 thousand hectares). It is the fifth most cultivated fruit in the country. The southeast of Pará has 85% of the state production: the cities of Floresta do Araguaia (76.45%), Conceição do Araguaia (8.42%) and Salvaterra (3.12%) led the ranking this year. Floresta do Araguaia also has the largest concentrated fruit juice industry in Brazil, exporting to European Union, United States and Mercosur.

Pará is also one of the largest Brazilian producers of coconut. In 2019, it was the 3rd largest producer in the country, with 191.8 million fruits harvested, second only to Bahia and Ceará.

Pará is the 2nd largest Brazilian producer of black pepper, with 34 thousand tons harvested in 2018.

The Brazil nut has always been one of the main products of extraction in Northern Brazil, with collection on the forest floor. However, in recent decades, the commercial cultivation of Brazil nut was created. There are already properties with more than 1 million chestnut trees for large-scale production. The annual production averages in Brazil varied between 20 thousand and 40 thousand tons per year in 2016.

In the production of cocoa, Pará has been competing with Bahia for the leadership of Brazilian production. In 2017 Pará obtained the leadership for the first time. In 2019, people from Pará harvested 135 thousand tons of cocoa, and Bahians harvested 130 thousand tons. Bahia's cocoa area is practically three times larger than that of Pará, but Pará's productivity is practically three times greater. Some factors that explain this are: the crops in Bahia are more extractivist, and those in Pará have a more modern and commercial style, in addition to paraenses using more productive and resistant seeds, and their region providing resistance to Witch's broom.

In 2018, Pará occupied the 6th national position in the banana production.

In 2018, Pará had the 5th largest cattle herd in Brazil, with 20.6 million head of cattle. The city of São Félix do Xingu is the largest in the country, with 2.2 million animals. Marabá is the 6th largest city in the country in numbers, with 1 million animals. In the ranking of the 20 main herds, Pará has seven names. Part of this is due to the fact that the municipalities of Pará have gigantic territory.

In 2017, in the iron ore sector, Pará was the 2nd largest national producer, with 169 million tons (of the 450 million produced by the country), at a value of R$25.5 billion. In copper, Pará produced almost 980 thousand tons (of the 1.28 million tons in Brazil), at a value of R$6.5 billion. In aluminum (bauxite), Pará carried out almost all Brazilian production (34.5 of 36.7 million tons) at a value of R$3 billion. In manganese, Pará produced a large part of Brazilian production (2.3 of 3.4 million tons) at a value of R$1 billion. In gold, Pará was the 3rd largest Brazilian producer, with 20 tons at a value of R$940 million. In nickel, Goiás and Pará are the only two producers in the country, with Pará being the 2nd in production, having obtained 90 thousand tons at a value of R$750 million. In tin, Pará the 3rd largest producer (4.4 thousand tons, at a value of R$114 million). Pará had 42.93% of the value of commercialized mineral production in Brazil, with almost R$38 billion.

Due to the proximity of the iron ore mines, Siderúrgica Norte Brasil (Sinobras) was created in Marabá. In 2018, the company produced 345 thousand tons of crude steel, of the 35.4 million produced in the country.

Pará had in 2017 an industrial GDP of R$43,8 billion, equivalent to 3.7% of the national industry. It employs 164,989 workers in the industry. The main industrial sectors are: Extraction of metallic minerals (46,9%), Industrial Public Utility Services, such as Electricity and Water (23.4%), Construction (14.8%), Metallurgy (4.3%) and Food (4.3%). These 5 sectors concentrate 93.7% of the state's industry.

Infrastructure

Airports 

Belém International Airport (BEL) is 10 km from the center of Belém.
 
Traditionally called Val-de-Cães Airport, it is responsible for increasing tourism in the region, as well as for the outflow of products and attracting new investments.

Port 
The Port of Belém has restaurants, art galleries, a small brewery, ice-cream shops, artisan stands, regional food kiosks, coffee houses, a space for fairs and events, a theatre for 400 spectators, and a touristic harbour.

Culture

Theatre 
 Theatre of Peace
 Experimental Waldemar Henrique theatre
 Gabriel Hermes theatre
 Theatre of SESC
 Theatre of Emílio Goeldi Museum
 Margarida Schiwazzapa theatre
 Maria Sylvia Nunes theatre
 Gasômetro station theatre

Círio de Nazaré 

The biggest festival in the state of Pará happens in Belém, Círio de Nazaré (Nazareth Taper). This event is known to be the biggest religious event of the Western Hemisphere. The procession starts on the second Sunday of October and pays homage to Our Lady of Nazareth, patron saint of the state. Organised since 1793, at present it gathers around 2.3 million of followers, who go on a procession through the city to the Nazaré Basilica, where her image is worshiped.

Indigenous communities 
Of these, more than eight million have been delimited by FUNAI (National Foundation of Indians), ensuring security and preservation of that space. Among the biggest indigenous communities there are the Andira Marau, Munduruku, and Kayapó.

Sports 

Belém provides visitors and residents with sport activities.

The Mangueirão stadium architectural project is from August 1969. In 2002, 24 years after its inauguration, Mangueirão was reinaugurated as an Olympic stadium of Pará. The visiting capacity of the stadium is at around 45,000.

Stadiums
 Olympic stadium of Pará
 Evandro Almeida stadium
 Jader Barbalho stadium
 Leônidas Castro stadium
 and many others

Flag 

The white stripe in the Flag of Pará represents the zodiac, the Equator and the Amazon River. The blue star is Spica in the constellation Virgo, which is also depicted on the Flag of Brazil representing the state. The two red areas symbolize the blood shed by the Cabanos in the Cabanagem revolt.

See also 
Belo Monte Dam
Deforestation of the Amazon Rainforest
Deforestation in Brazil

References

External links 

 Official website
 Brazilian Tourism Portal
 Portal Paraense

 
States of Brazil

States and territories established in 1772
1772 establishments in Brazil